Gorni Podlog is a village in the municipality of Kočani, North Macedonia.

Demographics
According to the 2002 census, the village had a total of 704 inhabitants. Ethnic groups in the village include:

Macedonians 702
Serbs 1
Bosniaks 1

References

Villages in Kočani Municipality